The 19th government of Turkey (22 May 1950 – 9 March 1951) was a government in the history of Turkey. It is also called the first Menderes government.

Background 
Democrat Party (DP) won the general elections held on 14 May 1950. This was the first election that was won by a party other than the Republican People's Party (CHP). Adnan Menderes of the Democrat Party became the prime minister.

The government
In the list below, the  cabinet members who served only a part of the cabinet's lifespan are shown in the column "Notes".

Aftermath
The government had the majority in the parliament, but Menderes resigned on 8 March 1951. According to journalist Metin Toker, Adnan Menderes asked one of his colleagues in the cabinet to resign, but the minister refused to resign. Legally, Menderes had no authority to force any minister to resign, and thus, Menderes preferred to end the entire government instead. But the president Celal Bayar appointed him to form the next government also.

References

Cabinets of Turkey
Democrat Party (Turkey, 1946–1961) politicians
1950 establishments in Turkey
1951 disestablishments in Turkey
Cabinets established in 1950
Cabinets disestablished in 1951
Members of the 19th government of Turkey
9th parliament of Turkey
Democrat Party (Turkey, 1946–1961)